The Republic, initially known as Republic 2030, is a centrist political party in Latvia. It was formed in 2021. The party is represented in the 13th Saeima with 4 deputies who were elected from the lists of Social Democratic Party "Harmony" (Vjačeslavs Dombrovskis, Evija Papule) and KPV LV (Kaspars Ģirģens, Ēriks Pucens) in the 2018 parliamentary election.

Election results

Legislative elections

References 

Centrist parties in Latvia
Political parties established in 2021